The Japan Media Arts Festival is an annual festival held since 1997 by Japan's Agency for Cultural Affairs. The festival begins with an open competition and culminates with the awarding of several prizes and an exhibition.

Based on judging by a jury of artistic peers, awards are given in four categories: Art (formerly called Non-Interactive Digital Art), Entertainment (formerly called Interactive Art; including video games and websites), animation, and manga. Within each category, one Grand Prize, four Excellence Prizes, and (since 2002) one Encouragement Prize are awarded. Other outstanding works, are selected by the Jury as Jury Selections.

The winning works of the four categories will receive a certificate, a trophy and a cash prize.

Digital Art (Non-Interactive Art) awards

Digital Art (Interactive Art) awards

Art awards

Entertainment awards

Animation awards

Manga awards

See also
 List of animation awards
 List of manga awards
 Lists of animated feature films
 BAFTA Award for Best Animated Film
 Annie Award for Best Animated Feature
 Golden Globe Award for Best Animated Feature Film
 Critics' Choice Movie Award for Best Animated Feature
 Annie Award for Best Animated Feature — Independent
 Saturn Award for Best Animated Film
 Animation Kobe
 Tokyo Anime Award

References

External links
 Official website 
 Japan Media Arts Festival Archive 
 

New media art festivals
Anime awards
Festival organizations
International awards
Art festivals in Japan
Annual events in Japan
Arts organizations based in Japan
Awards established in 1997
Festivals established in 1997
Arts organizations established in 1997
1997 establishments in Japan
Manga awards